Cerithiopsis is a genus of very small sea snails, marine gastropod  mollusks or micromollusks in the family Cerithiopsidae.

Distribution
This genus occurs in the Caribbean Sea including Cuba, in the Atlantic Ocean including the Cape Verde islands and Angola and in the Indian Ocean including the Aldabra Atoll.

Species
Species within the genus Cerithiopsis include:

 Cerithiopsis abjecta Preston, 1905
 Cerithiopsis abreojosensis Bartsch, 1911
 Cerithiopsis academicorum Rolán & Espinosa, 1996
 Cerithiopsis acontium Dall, 1889
 Cerithiopsis aequatorialis Thiele, 1925
  † Cerithiopsis aequicincta Suter, 1917
 Cerithiopsis agulhasensis Thiele, 1925
 Cerithiopsis aimen Rolán & Espinosa, 1996
 Cerithiopsis alabastrula (Mörch, 1876)
 Cerithiopsis albovittata (C. B. Adams, 1850)
 Cerithiopsis alfredensis Bartsch, 1915
 Cerithiopsis althea Dall, 1927
 Cerithiopsis altiusae Cecalupo & Perugia, 2020
 Cerithiopsis amabilis (Bayle, 1880) 
 Cerithiopsis anaitis Bartsch, 1918
 † Cerithiopsis andreae Schnetler & M. S. Nielsen, 2018 
 Cerithiopsis annae Cecalupo & Buzzurro, 2005
 Cerithiopsis antemunda Bartsch, 1911
 Cerithiopsis apexcostata Rolán, Espinosa, Fernández-Garcés, 2007
 Cerithiopsis apicicosta May, 1920
 Cerithiopsis apicina Dall, 1927
 Cerithiopsis aquilum Rehder, 1980
 Cerithiopsis ara Dall & Bartsch, 1911
 Cerithiopsis aralia Olsson & Harbison, 1953
 Cerithiopsis arga Kay, 1979
 Cerithiopsis argentea Dall, 1927
 Cerithiopsis arnoldi Bartsch, 1911
 Cerithiopsis atalaya Watson, 1885
 Cerithiopsis aurea Bartsch, 1911
 Cerithiopsis baculiformis Thiele, 1925
 Cerithiopsis baculum A. Adams, 1861
 Cerithiopsis bakeri Bartsch, 1917
 Cerithiopsis bakisi Cecalupo & Perugia, 2020
 Cerithiopsis balaustium Figueira & Pimenta, 2008
 Cerithiopsis barleei Jeffreys, 1867
 Cerithiopsis barthelati Cecalupo & Perugia, 2020
 Cerithiopsis beneitoi Rolán, Espinosa & Fernández-Garcés, 2007
 Cerithiopsis berryi Bartsch, 1911
 Cerithiopsis bicolor Bartsch, 1911
 Cerithiopsis bilineata (Hoernes, 1848)
 Cerithiopsis blandi Deshayes in Vignal, 1900
 † Cerithiopsis boanderseni Schnetler & M. S. Nielsen, 2018 
 Cerithiopsis boucheti Jay & Drivas, 2002
 Cerithiopsis bouchonorum Cecalupo & Perugia, 2020
 Cerithiopsis boutrini Cecalupo & Perugia, 2020
 Cerithiopsis bristolae Baker, Hanna & Strong, 1938
 Cerithiopsis brivalae Cecalupo & Perugia, 2020
 Cerithiopsis brugneauxae Cecalupo & Perugia, 2020
 Cerithiopsis brunnea Thiele, 1930
 Cerithiopsis brunneoflavida Preston, 1905
 † Cerithiopsis burkevillensis Dall, 1913 
 Cerithiopsis buzzurroi (Cecalupo & Robba, 2010)
 Cerithiopsis cabritensis Cecalupo & Perugia, 2020
 Cerithiopsis caelata (Gould, 1849)
 Cerithiopsis capixaba Figueira & Pimenta, 2008
 Cerithiopsis caribbaea (Gabb, 1881)
 Cerithiopsis carlottae Cecalupo & Perugia, 2018
 Cerithiopsis carpenteri Bartsch, 1911
 Cerithiopsis carrota (Laseron, 1956)
 Cerithiopsis ceac Rolán & Fernández-Garcés, 2010
 Cerithiopsis cerea Carpenter, 1857
 † Cerithiopsis cerithiopsoides Landau, Ceulemans & Van Dingenen, 2018 
 Cerithiopsis cesta Bartsch, 1911
 Cerithiopsis chambardi Cecalupo & Perugia, 2020
 Cerithiopsis charlottensis Bartsch, 1917
 Cerithiopsis cinereoflava (Mörch, 1876)
 Cerithiopsis columna Carpenter, 1864
 Cerithiopsis cruzana Usticke, 1959
 Cerithiopsis curtata Bartsch, 1911
 Cerithiopsis dannyi Cecalupo & Perugia, 2020
 Cerithiopsis decora Dall, 1927
 Cerithiopsis demaziereae Cecalupo & Perugia, 2020
 Cerithiopsis desjobertae Cecalupo & Perugia, 2020
 Cerithiopsis denticulata (Cecalupo & Robba, 2010)
 Cerithiopsis destrugesi (de Folin, 1867)
 Cerithiopsis diadema Monterosato, 1874
 Cerithiopsis dilata Rolán, Espinosa, Fernández-Garcés, 2007
 Cerithiopsis diomedeae Bartsch, 1911
 Cerithiopsis docata Dall, 1927
 Cerithiopsis dominguezi Rolán & Espinosa, 1996
 Cerithiopsis domlamyi Cecalupo & Perugia, 2020
 Cerithiopsis dubreuili Cecalupo & Perugia, 2020
 Cerithiopsis eiseni Strong & Hertlein, 1939
 Cerithiopsis electrina Hedley, 1899
 Cerithiopsis elima Dall, 1927
 Cerithiopsis eliza Dall, 1927
 Cerithiopsis elsa Dall, 1927
 † Cerithiopsis emilieae Schnetler & M. S. Nielsen, 2018 
 † Cerithiopsis eopachus Lozouet, Lesport & Renard, 2001 
 Cerithiopsis erna Bartsch, 1915
 † Cerithiopsis esterae Landau, Ceulemans & Van Dingenen, 2018 
 Cerithiopsis etiennei Cecalupo & Perugia, 2020
 Cerithiopsis eutrapela Melvill & Standen, 1896
 Cerithiopsis euxinica Milaschewitsch, 1916
 Cerithiopsis exquisita G.B. Sowerby III, 1897
 Cerithiopsis familiarum Rolán, Espinosa & Fernández-Garcés, 2007
 Cerithiopsis fasciata Golikov & Gulbin, 1978
 Cerithiopsis fayalensis Watson, 1880
 Cerithiopsis flava (C. B. Adams, 1850)
 Cerithiopsis flavida Golikov & Gulbin, 1978
 Cerithiopsis floridana Dall, 1892
 Cerithiopsis fosterae Melvill & Standen, 1896
 Cerithiopsis foveolata (Sowerby III, 1892)
 Cerithiopsis fraseri Bartsch, 1921 
 Cerithiopsis fuscoflava Rolán & Espinosa, 1996
 Cerithiopsis fusiformis (C. B. Adams, 1850)
 Cerithiopsis galapagensis Bartsch, 1911
 Cerithiopsis gemmulosa (C. B. Adams, 1850)
 Cerithiopsis georgiana Dall, 1927
 Cerithiopsis gissleri Strong & Hertlein, 1939
 Cerithiopsis giuliafassioae Cecalupo & Perugia, 2020
 Cerithiopsis gloriosa Bartsch, 1911
 Cerithiopsis gordaensis Rolán & Fernández-Garcés, 2010
 Cerithiopsis greenii (C.B. Adams, 1839)
 Cerithiopsis greppii Buzzurro & Cecalupo, 2005
  Cerithiopsis grippi Bartsch, 1917
 Cerithiopsis guanacastensis Hertlein & Strong, 1951
 Cerithiopsis guatulcoensis Hertlein & Strong, 1951
 Cerithiopsis guitarti Espinosa & Ortea, 2001
 Cerithiopsis halia Bartsch, 1911
 Cerithiopsis hielardae Cecalupo & Perugia, 2020
 Cerithiopsis hedista Melvill & Standen, 1896 
 Cerithiopsis hero Bartsch, 1911
 Cerithiopsis honora Dall, 1927
 Cerithiopsis inespazosae Rolán & Gori, 2013
 Cerithiopsis horrida (Monterosato, 1874)
 Cerithiopsis inespazosae Rolán & Gori, 2013
 Cerithiopsis infrequens (C.B. Adams, 1852)
 Cerithiopsis ingens (Bartsch, 1907)
 † Cerithiopsis inopinus Hoerle, 1972 
 Cerithiopsis insignis E.A. Smith, 1906
 Cerithiopsis io Dall & Bartsch, 1911
 Cerithiopsis iochrous Jay & Drivas, 2002
 Cerithiopsis iontha Bartsch, 1911
 Cerithiopsis iota (C. B. Adams, 1845)
 Cerithiopsis iudithae Reitano & Buzzurro, 2006
 Cerithiopsis iuxtafuniculata Rolán, Espinosa & Fernández-Garcés, 2007
 Cerithiopsis janira Bartsch in Golikov & Scarlato, 1967
 Cerithiopsis jeffreysi Watson, 1885
 Cerithiopsis jousseaumei Jay & Drivas, 2002
 Cerithiopsis kinoi Baker, Hanna & Strong, 1938
 Cerithiopsis krisbergi Rolán & Fernández-Garcés, 2007
 Cerithiopsis ladae Prkic & Buzzurro, 2007
 Cerithiopsis lamyi Jay & Drivas, 2002
 Cerithiopsis lata (C. B. Adams, 1850)
 Cerithiopsis leipha Dall, 1927
 Cerithiopsis leopardus Rolán & Gori, 2013
 † Cerithiopsis luiseae Schnetler & M. S. Nielsen, 2018 
 Cerithiopsis magellanica Bartsch, 1911
 Cerithiopsis matara Dall, 1889 
 Cerithiopsis mathildaeformis Melvill, 1906
 Cerithiopsis melvilli Jay & Drivas, 2002
 Cerithiopsis merida Dall, 1927
 Cerithiopsis micalii (Cecalupo & Villari, 1997)
 Cerithiopsis michellegalli Cecalupo & Perugia, 2020
 Cerithiopsis michezae Cecalupo & Perugia, 2020
 Cerithiopsis minima (Brusina, 1865)
 Cerithiopsis minutissima Thiele, 1925
 † Cerithiopsis mira Landau, Ceulemans & Van Dingenen, 2018 
 Cerithiopsis montereyensis Bartsch, 1911
 Cerithiopsis montezumai Strong & Hertlein, 1939
 Cerithiopsis morelosensis Rolán & Fernández-Garcés, 2010
 Cerithiopsis movilla Dall & Bartsch, 1911
 † Cerithiopsis mucro (Laws, 1939) †
 Cerithiopsis natachae Cecalupo & Perugia, 2020
 Cerithiopsis nana Jeffreys, 1867
 Cerithiopsis neglecta (C.B. Adams, 1852)
 Cerithiopsis niasensis Thiele, 1925
 Cerithiopsis nina Bartsch, 1915
 Cerithiopsis nofronii Amati, 1987
 Cerithiopsis nutzeli Jay & Drivas, 2002
 Cerithiopsis oaxacana Hertlein & Strong, 1951
 Cerithiopsis oculisfictis Prkic & Mariottini, 2010
 Cerithiopsis oliviergrosi Cecalupo & Perugia, 2020
 Cerithiopsis onealensis Bartsch, 1921
 Cerithiopsis orientalis Preston, 1905
 Cerithiopsis oxys Bartsch, 1911
 Cerithiopsis pallida Golikov, 1988
 Cerithiopsis pandangensis Thiele, 1925
 Cerithiopsis paramoea Bartsch, 1911
 Cerithiopsis parvada Rolán, Espinosa & Fernández-Garcés, 2007
 Cerithiopsis paucispiralis Rolán & Fernandes, 1989
 Cerithiopsis pedroana Bartsch, 1907
 Cerithiopsis pennecae Cecalupo & Perugia, 2020
 Cerithiopsis perigaudae Cecalupo & Perugia, 2020
 Cerithiopsis perlata (Monterosato, 1889)
 Cerithiopsis perrini Hertlein & Strong, 1951
 Cerithiopsis pesa Dall & Bartsch, 1911
 Cerithiopsis petala Dall, 1927
 Cerithiopsis petanii Prkic & Mariottini, 2010
 Cerithiopsis piaseckii Cecalupo & Perugia, 2020
 Cerithiopsis pickeringae Jay & Drivas, 2002
 Cerithiopsis porteri Baker, Hanna & Strong, 1938
 Cerithiopsis portoi Rolán & Espinosa, 1996
 † Cerithiopsis postuloclathrata Darragh, 2017 
 Cerithiopsis powelli Marshall, 1978
 Cerithiopsis prieguei Rolán & Espinosa, 1996
 Cerithiopsis pseudomovilla Rolán & Espinosa, 1996
 Cerithiopsis pulcherrima Melvill, 1896
 Cerithiopsis pulchresculpta Cachia, Mifsud & Sammut, 2004
 Cerithiopsis pulvis (Issel, 1869)
 Cerithiopsis pupiformis Carpenter, 1857
 Cerithiopsis rabilleri Cecalupo & Perugia, 2020
 Cerithiopsis recourti Cecalupo & Perugia, 2020
 Cerithiopsis redferni Cecalupo & Perugia, 2020
 Cerithiopsis rostaingi Cecalupo & Perugia, 2020
 Cerithiopsis rubricincta Melvill, 1896
 † Cerithiopsis saepta (Marwick, 1931) 
 Cerithiopsis satisnodosa Rolán & Fernández-Garcés, 2010
 Cerithiopsis scalaris (Locard, 1892)
 Cerithiopsis seddonae Jay & Drivas, 2002
 Cerithiopsis serina Dall, 1927
 Cerithiopsis shepstonensis Tomlin, 1923
 † Cerithiopsis simulator (Laws, 1939) 
 Cerithiopsis singularis Rolán & Fernández-Garcés, 2013
 Cerithiopsis sorex Carpenter, 1857
 Cerithiopsis soror Thiele, 1925
 Cerithiopsis spongicola Habe, 1960
 Cerithiopsis stejnegeri Dall, 1884
 Cerithiopsis stephensae Bartsch, 1909
 Cerithiopsis stylifera Thiele, 1930
 Cerithiopsis subgloriosa Baker, Hanna & Strong, 1938
 Cerithiopsis subreticulata (Dunker, 1860)
 Cerithiopsis sumatrensis Thiele, 1925
 Cerithiopsis susieae Rolán & Krisberg, 2014 
 Cerithiopsis sykesii Melvill, 1896
 Cerithiopsis tarruellasi Peñas & Rolán, 2006
 † Cerithiopsis temperans (Marwick, 1931) 
 Cerithiopsis tenthrenois (Melvill, 1896)
 Cerithiopsis tubercularis (Montagu, 1803)
 Cerithiopsis tuberculoides Carpenter, 1857
 Cerithiopsis tumida (Bartsch, 1907)
 Cerithiopsis vanhyningi Bartsch, 1918
 Cerithiopsis vaurisi Jay & Drivas, 2002
 Cerithiopsis vicola Dall & Bartsch, 1911
 † Cerithiopsis vignali Cossmann & Perot, 1922 
 Cerithiopsis vinca Olsson & Harbison, 1953
 Cerithiopsis virginica Henderson & Bartsch, 1914
 Cerithiopsis vitrea Dall, 1927
 Cerithiopsis warmkae Jong & Coomans, 1988
 Cerithiopsis wayae Jay & Drivas, 2002
 Cerithiopsis willetti Bartsch, 1921 

Species brought into synonymy
 Subgenus Cerithiopsis (Joculator) Hedley, 1909: synonym of Joculator Hedley, 1909
 Subgenus Cerithiopsis (Metaxia) Monterosato, 1884: synonym of Metaxia Monterosato, 1884
 Subgenus Cerithiopsis (Seila) A. Adams, 1861: synonym of Seila A. Adams, 1861
 Cerithiopsis acies Suter, 1908: synonym of Zaclys sarissa (Murdoch, 1905)
 Cerithiopsis adamsi Bartsch, 1911: synonym of Cerithiopsina adamsi (Bartsch, 1911)
 Cerithiopsis amblytera Watson, 1880: synonym of Cerithiella amblytera (Watson, 1880)
 Cerithiopsis balteata Watson, 1881: synonym of Horologica balteata (Watson, 1881)
 Cerithiopsis barleii: synonym of Cerithiopsis barleei Jeffreys, 1867
 Cerithiopsis bermudensis Verrill & Bush, 1900: synonym of Metaxia rugulosa (C. B. Adams, 1850)
 Cerithiopsis bicolor (C. B. Adams, 1845): synonym of Retilaskeya bicolor (C. B. Adams, 1845)
 Cerithiopsis bizonalis Jeffreys, 1885: synonym of Cerithiella metula (Lovén, 1846)
 Cerithiopsis buijsei Jong & Coomans, 1988: synonym of Cerithiopsis lata (C. B. Adams, 1850)
 Cerithiopsis canaliculata Suter, 1908: synonym of Specula retifera (Suter, 1908)
 Cerithiopsis concinna Sykes, 1925: synonym of Narrimania concinna (Sykes, 1925)
 Cerithiopsis cosmia Bartsch, 1907: synonym of Cerithiopsidella cosmia (Bartsch, 1907)
 Cerithiopsis costulatus (Møller, 1842): synonym of Eumetula arctica (Mørch, 1857)
 Cerithiopsis crenistria Suter, 1907: synonym of Alipta crenistria (Suter, 1907)
 Cerithiopsis crystallina Dall, 1881: synonym of Varicopeza crystallina (Dall, 1881)
 Cerithiopsis cynthia Bartsch, 1911: synonym of Cerithiopsis iota (C. B. Adams, 1845)
 Cerithiopsis diegensis Bartsch, 1911: synonym of Cerithiopsida diegensis (Bartsch, 1911)
 Cerithiopsis emersonii (C.B. Adams, 1839): synonym of Retilaskeya emersonii (C.B. Adams, 1839)
 Cerithiopsis excelsum Yokoyama, 1928: synonym of Orectospira shikoensis (Yokoyama, 1928)
 Cerithiopsis geniculosus Hedley, 1911: synonym of Altispecula geniculosa (Hedley, 1911)
 Cerithiopsis hadfieldi Jay & Drivas, 2002: synonym of Synthopsis hadfieldi (Jay & Drivas, 2002)
 Cerithiopsis infracolor Laseron, 1951: synonym of Prolixodens infracolor (Laseron, 1951)
 Cerithiopsis marginata Suter, 1908: synonym of Mendax marginata (Suter, 1908)
 Cerithiopsis metaxae (delle Chiaje, 1828): synonym of Metaxia metaxa (delle Chiaje, 1828)
 Cerithiopsis nana Mayer, 1864: synonym of Bittium nanum (Mayer, 1864)
 Cerithiopsis oculisfictis Prkic & Mariottini, 2010: synonym of Cerithiopsis tubercularis (Montagu, 1803)
 Cerithiopsis peilei E.A. Smith, 1910: synonym of Seilopsis peilei (E.A. Smith, 1910)
 Cerithiopsis pulchella Jeffreys, 1858: synonym of Cerithiopsis jeffreysi Watson, 1885
 Cerithiopsis ridicula Watson, 1886: synonym of Joculator ridiculus (Watson, 1886)
 Cerithiopsis sarissa Murdoch, 1905: synonym of Zaclys sarissa (Murdoch, 1905)
 Cerithiopsis semipicta Gould, 1861: synonym of Joculator semipictus (Gould, 1861)
 Cerithiopsis shikoensis Yokoyama, 1928: synonym of Orectospira shikoensis (Yokoyama, 1928)
 Cerithiopsis signa Bartsch, 1921: synonym of Cerithiopsina signa (Bartsch, 1921)
 Cerithiopsis sigsbeana Dall, 1881: synonym of Cerithiella sigsbeana (Dall, 1881)
 Cerithiopsis sinon (Bayle, 1880): synonym of Royella sinon (Bayle, 1880)
 Cerithiopsis styliformis Suter, 1908: synonym of Specula styliformis (Suter, 1908)
 Cerithiopsis subantarctica Suter, 1908: synonym of Zaclys sarissa (Murdoch, 1905)
 Cerithiopsis tribulationis Hedley, 1909: synonym of Joculator tribulationis (Hedley, 1909)
 Cerithiopsis trizonalis Odhner, 1924: synonym of Mendax trizonalis (Odhner, 1924)
 Cerithiopsis turbonilloides Dautzenberg & H. Fischer, 1896: synonym of Ektonos turbonilloides (Dautzenberg & Fischer H., 1896)
 Cerithiopsis turrigera Watson, 1886: synonym of Joculator turriger (Watson, 1886)
 Cerithiopsis valeriae Giusti Fr., 1987: synonym of Onchodia valeriae (Giusti Fr., 1987)
 Cerithiopsis westiana Hedley, 1909: synonym of Horologica westiana (Hedley, 1909)

References

 Vaught, K.C. (1989). A classification of the living Mollusca. American Malacologists: Melbourne, FL (USA). . XII, 195 pp.
 Gofas, S.; Le Renard, J.; Bouchet, P. (2001). Mollusca, in: Costello, M.J. et al. (Ed.) (2001). European register of marine species: a check-list of the marine species in Europe and a bibliography of guides to their identification. Collection Patrimoines Naturels, 50: pp. 180–213
 Rolán E., 2005. Malacological Fauna From The Cape Verde Archipelago. Part 1, Polyplacophora and Gastropoda.

 
Cerithiopsidae
Gastropod genera
Taxa named by Edward Forbes
Taxa named by Sylvanus Charles Thorp Hanley